Ctenaspidae is a family of extinct cyathaspidiform heterostracan agnathans in the suborder Cyathaspidida.

If Amphiaspidida can be ignored as a daughter-taxon, the family Ctenaspidae contains Ctenaspis and its various sister-taxa originally contained within both Ctenaspididae and Ctenaspididae, including Allocryptaspis, Alainaspis, Zaphoctenaspis, Arctictenaspis, and Boothiaspis, which was first described as a "Canadian amphiaspid."

References 

Cyathaspidida
Prehistoric jawless fish families